Todd Andrew Woodbridge, OAM (born 2 April 1971) is an Australian former professional tennis player and current sports broadcaster with the Nine Network.

Woodbridge is best known for his successful Doubles partnerships with Mark Woodforde (nicknamed "The Woodies") and later Jonas Björkman. His nickname was “a little bit wet”. He is among the most successful doubles players of all time, having won 16 Grand Slam men's doubles titles (nine Wimbledons, three US Opens, three Australian Opens and one French Open), and a further six Grand Slam mixed doubles titles (three US Opens, one French Open, one Wimbledon, one Australian Open). Additionally, he was a gold medalist with Woodforde at the 1996 Summer Olympics to complete a career Golden Slam. In total he has won 83 ATP doubles titles. Woodbridge reached the World No. 1 doubles ranking in July 1992. 

Woodbridge was awarded the Medal of the Order of the Australia in the 1997 Australia Day Honours "for service to sport as gold medallist at the Atlanta Olympic Games, 1996". In 2002, he was inducted into the Australian Institute of Sport 'Best of the Best'.

Woodbridge was at the Seven Network between 2006 and 2018, working for Seven Sport as a tennis commentator, where he was also a host of the network's Australian Open coverage. In April 2018, he hosted the morning sessions of the 2018 Commonwealth Games on the Gold Coast for the network.

In 2014, alongside Woodforde, the International Tennis Federation (ITF) presented him with its highest accolade, the Philippe Chatrier award, for his contributions to tennis.

In 2018, Woodbridge was signed by the Nine Network as a commentator for Wide World of Sports tennis, including the Australian Open after winning the broadcast rights for 6 years. Wimbledon 2018 was the final event he covered for the Nine Network.

Tennis career

Juniors
In juniors, Woodbridge made the finals of the Jr Australian Open in 1987 and 1989, and Wimbledon in 1989.

Pro tour

He is best known as one of the top doubles players in the world for most of the 1990s and into the early 2000s (decade). His primary doubles partnerships were first with fellow Australian Mark Woodforde and later with Swede Jonas Björkman. Woodbridge and Woodforde are often referred to as "The Woodies" in the tennis world. Woodbridge also had a career high singles ranking of 19 after reaching the semifinals of Wimbledon in 1997, beating Michael Chang, Marcos Ondruska, Alex Rădulescu, Patrick Rafter and Nicolas Kiefer before losing to Pete Sampras. He did however have the distinction of being one of only seven players to beat Sampras at Wimbledon, knocking him out in the first round in 1989 (Sampras's first ever Wimbledon match).

The Woodies won a record 61 ATP doubles titles as a team, including 11 Grand Slam events. Woodforde and Woodbridge won a gold medal at the 1996 Atlanta Olympics, and reached the final to win a silver medal at the 2000 Sydney Olympics. In the fourth set tie-breaker against Canadians Sébastien Lareau and Daniel Nestor, Woodbridge served a double fault to lose the match.

After Woodforde retired from the tour in 2000, Woodbridge established a partnership with Björkman that resulted in five Grand Slam titles in four years. At the end of 2004, Björkman ended his partnership with Woodbridge. According to an interview Woodbridge granted to the Australian Broadcasting Corporation, Björkman wanted him to play more weeks on the tour, but Woodbridge wanted to limit his time away from his family as much as possible. Woodbridge then took on India's Mahesh Bhupathi as his new partner, who had just been dumped by Belarusian Max Mirnyi. Coincidentally, Björkman and Mirnyi ended up partnering together.
 
Woodbridge announced his retirement at the 2005 Wimbledon Championships after 17 years as a tennis professional and 83 ATP tournament doubles titles, an all-time record at the time now surpassed by the Bryan brothers. He was a member of the Australian Davis Cup Team, playing the most ties (32) of any player. According to the ATP website, he finished his career with US$10,095,245 in prize money.

After retirement

In 2006 and 2007, Woodbridge joined the Seven Network's commentary team for the Australian Open.

He also became an ambassador for bowel cancer awareness group "Let's Beat Bowel Cancer". A Cabrini Health initiative.

In 2007, Woodbridge joined the 6th season of Dancing with the Stars, the Australian version. In 2008 and 2009, Woodbridge aligned himself closely to the sailing community through his commitments at Hamilton Island Race Week hosting tennis clinics and wine tasting events.

Woodbridge served as the tournament director for the 2009 Australian Open legends event. In July 2009, he was appointed coach of the Australian Davis Cup Team, taking on a newly expanded, full-time position that merges a role as the national men's coach overseeing the male player development pathway with the Davis Cup coaching job.

In January 2010 on Australia day, The Woodies were inducted to the Australian Tennis Hall of Fame for their achievements in tennis. As a part of the induction ceremony, their bronzed statues were placed with other great Australian tennis players at the Melbourne Park. In July 2010 The Woodies were inducted to the International Tennis Hall of Fame.

In January 2011, Woodbridge was confronted on court by Belgian player Kim Clijsters for comments he made via SMS to Rennae Stubbs alleging Clijsters was pregnant. In June that year, Woodbridge started anchoring the Seven Network's Wimbledon coverage.

Woodbridge had planned to compete in the 2021 Margaret Court Cup in Albury, but was prevented from doing so by domestic border closures.

In 2019, Woodbridge joined the Nine Network's as a sport commentator and presenter covering the Australian Open and The Ashes. Todd is currently a fill-in sport presenter on Nine News Melbourne.

Personal life
He was born in Sydney and raised in Woolooware by his parents, Kevin and Barbara. He has two older brothers, Gregory and Warren. He attended Woolooware High School, then turned professional in 1988.

Todd and Natasha Woodbridge married on 8 April 1995 in Melbourne; they have two children, Zara and Beau.

Grand Slam finals

Doubles: 20 (16–4)

Mixed doubles: 14 (6–8)

Career finals

Singles: 9 (2–7)

Doubles: 114 (83–31)

Performance timelines

Singles

1This event was held in Stockholm through 1994, Essen in 1995, and Stuttgart from 1996 through 2001.

Doubles

References

External links
 
 
 
 

1971 births
Australian expatriate sportspeople in the United States
Australian male tennis players
Australian Open (tennis) champions
Australian Open (tennis) junior champions
Australian television presenters
French Open champions
French Open junior champions
Hopman Cup competitors
Olympic gold medalists for Australia
Olympic medalists in tennis
Olympic silver medalists for Australia
Olympic tennis players of Australia
Australian tennis commentators
Tennis people from Florida
Tennis players from Sydney
Tennis players at the 1992 Summer Olympics
Tennis players at the 1996 Summer Olympics
Tennis players at the 2000 Summer Olympics
Tennis players at the 2004 Summer Olympics
US Open (tennis) champions
Wimbledon champions
Wimbledon junior champions
Recipients of the Medal of the Order of Australia
Australian Institute of Sport tennis players
Grand Slam (tennis) champions in mixed doubles
Grand Slam (tennis) champions in men's doubles
Medalists at the 1996 Summer Olympics
Medalists at the 2000 Summer Olympics
Living people
International Tennis Hall of Fame inductees
Grand Slam (tennis) champions in boys' doubles
ATP number 1 ranked doubles tennis players
ITF World Champions
Sport Australia Hall of Fame inductees